The 7th Annual Transgender Erotica Awards was a pornographic awards event recognizing the best in transgender pornography form the previous year from November 1, 2013 to  October 1,  2014. the nominees were announced on October 16, 2014, online on the theteashow.com website. The winners were announced during the awards on February 15, 2014. There were a total of 22 Award categories.

Between these awards and the previous awards, the name of the awards was changed from the Tranny Awards to the Transgender Erotica Awards. It was cited as being done to give off a less offensive name and to be more inclusive of all people involved in transgender erotica. The change of name was widely positively received by the attendees at the awards.

Winners and nominees
The nominations for the 7th Transgender Erotica Awards were announced online and opened to fan voting on October 16, 2014, online on the theteashow.com website. The winners were announced during the awards on February 15, 2015.

Awards
Winners are listed first, highlighted in boldface.

References

Transgender Erotica Awards
Pornographic film awards
21st-century awards
American pornographic film awards
Annual events in the United States
Awards established in 2008
Culture of Los Angeles
Adult industry awards